Raúl Diniz (9 February 1951 – 25 May 2019) was a Portuguese weightlifter. He competed at the 1972 Summer Olympics, the 1980 Summer Olympics and the 1984 Summer Olympics.

References

External links
 

1951 births
2019 deaths
Portuguese male weightlifters
Olympic weightlifters of Portugal
Weightlifters at the 1972 Summer Olympics
Weightlifters at the 1980 Summer Olympics
Weightlifters at the 1984 Summer Olympics
Place of birth missing
20th-century Portuguese people
21st-century Portuguese people